Åkers styckebruk is a locality situated in Strängnäs Municipality, Södermanland County, Sweden with 2,891 inhabitants in 2010.

Riksdag elections 
With a strong industrial heritage and being a left-wing stronghold as late as the early 21st century, Åkers styckebruk then saw a rapid transformation towards the right in the following elections, becoming more electorally similar to the rest of the historically right-leaning Strängnäs Municipality.

References 

Populated places in Södermanland County
Populated places in Strängnäs Municipality